Gary Shadbolt is a male former weightlifter who competed for England.

Weightlifting career
Shadbolt represented England and won a bronze medal in the 82.5 kg light-heavyweight division, at the 1978 Commonwealth Games in Edmonton, Alberta, Canada.

References

English male weightlifters
Commonwealth Games medallists in weightlifting
Commonwealth Games bronze medallists for England
Weightlifters at the 1978 Commonwealth Games
Medallists at the 1978 Commonwealth Games